The CSI novels are novels that tie-in with the CSI: Crime Scene Investigation, CSI: Miami, and CSI: NY television shows. They have been published from 2001 to 2011.

They are all released by Pocket Books and have been written by a range of notable authors including Max Allan Collins (CSI: Crime Scene Investigation), Donn Cortez (CSI: Miami), and Stuart M. Kaminsky (CSI: NY).

Stories

CSI: Crime Scene Investigation

In October 2007, Pocket Books released a trade paperback omnibus Mortal Wounds, which collected Double Dealer, Sin City, and Cold Burn into a single volume.

CSI: Miami

CSI: NY

See also

 CSI comics
 List of television series made into books

References

Novels, CSI
CSI: Crime Scene Investigation
CSI: Miami
CSI: NY
Novels based on television series
Pocket Books books